Virgin Voyages is a cruise line headquartered in Plantation, Florida and a joint venture between the Virgin Group and Bain Capital.

As of April 2022, Virgin Voyages has two ships in the fleet, with two more on order, all with an expected capacity of approximately 2,700 passengers each. The first ship, Scarlet Lady, began sailing August 6 from Portsmouth with UK only itineraries. Scarlet Lady began operating from PortMiami in October 2021, sailing mainly four-to-five night cruises in the Caribbean.

History

Saverimuttu later collaborated with Bain Capital to begin market research and found that there was potential in the cruise industry for a new line to emerge and also identified a large, young demographic yet to experience cruising that could become the brand's target market. Over the next three years, Saverimuttu and McAlpin raised US$700 million from Bain Capital, which had become lead investor, and other institutional and private investors, and also borrowed an additional US$1–1.5 billion. After the financial backing, on December 4, 2014, Virgin Group announced the establishment of Virgin Cruises. The cruise line would be led by Tom McAlpin, who was named president and CEO.

At time of establishment, Virgin announced the new cruise line's fleet would consist of two ships and its headquarters would be based in the Miami/Fort Lauderdale area. In July 2015, the Miami-Dade County Commission granted Virgin Voyages approval to berth at PortMiami, and the company's first contract for three cruise ships was finalized on October 18, 2016, the same day that Virgin Cruises rebranded as Virgin Voyages, in an effort to strengthen its marketing aimed at the younger demographic and new cruisers.

In February 2018, Virgin Voyages debuted its headquarters in Plantation, Florida. In November 2018, Virgin Voyages expanded its commitment to Miami by announcing it would build Terminal V, a new 100,000 square-foot terminal at PortMiami estimated at US$150 million, with a scheduled completion in November 2021, and also sail the cruise line's first two vessels from Miami through 2022. In February 2019, Virgin Voyages announced it would design a new private destination called The Beach Club, located on the Bahamian island of Bimini. The resort would be developed in partnership with Genting Group's Resorts World Bimini and would feature a variety of local cuisine offerings and scheduled activities for guests. In September 2019, Virgin Voyages had been granted a 30-year berthing rights agreement at PortMiami.

Virgin Voyages' official debut had originally been scheduled for April 1, 2020, with the maiden voyage of Scarlet Lady, but the COVID-19 pandemic has delayed the cruise line's launch, having had to initially postpone the voyage until August 7, 2020, and ultimately, October 16, 2020. The first sailing with paying guests commenced on August 6, 2021 from Portsmouth.

Fleet
On June 23, 2015, Virgin announced that it had signed a binding letter of intent with Italian shipbuilder Fincantieri for the construction of three cruise ships to be delivered in 2020, 2021 and 2022—mid-sized vessels of 110,000 GT each with 1,150 crew, and 1,430 guest cabins capable of hosting a total of more than 2,800 passengers. The final contract for the construction of the ships was signed in October 2016, with the total cost expected to be under US$2 billion. McAlpin explained the ships would be designed differently from existing ships in the market, targeting the "young at heart." The fleet uses a stern design which maximizes “billboard value” visibility of the red Virgin logo, visible up to 2 nautical miles away. A fourth ship was ordered in October 2018 for delivery in 2023.

In November 2016, Virgin Voyages announced it had partnered with Climeon for its clean energy system to be deployed on its ships to generate energy from the engines' cooling water to reduce carbon dioxide emissions. In February 2019, Virgin Voyages also revealed it would ban all single-use plastics from its fleet.

Current fleet

Future fleet

References

External links
Virgin Voyages – official site

Voyages
Bain Capital companies
American companies established in 2014
Transport companies established in 2014
Cruise lines
2014 establishments in Florida